
Gmina Chąśno is a rural gmina (administrative district) in Łowicz County, Łódź Voivodeship, in central Poland.

Villages
Gmina Chąśno contains the villages and settlements of Błędów, Chąśno, Goleńsko, Karnków, Karsznice Duże, Karsznice Małe, Marianka, Mastki, Niespusza-Wieś, Nowa Niespusza, Przemysłów, Sierżniki, Skowroda Północna, Skowroda Południowa and Wyborów.

Neighbouring gminas
Gmina Chąśno is bordered by the town of Łowicz and by the gminas of Kiernozia, Kocierzew Południowy, Łowicz and Zduny.

References
 Polish official population figures 2006

Chasno
Łowicz County